Nuriro is a class of train operated by Korail, the national railroad of South Korea, it was introduced on June 1, 2009, to replace the short-range Mugunghwa-ho.
The train was introduced as a replacement for the Bidulgi-ho/Tongil-ho/Mugunghwa-ho operating system between Seoul and Onyangoncheon, and will replace the short-range Mugunghwa-ho when a new train comes in. However, due to various problems, it is currently operating in Yeongdong Line and Jungang Line as a replacement for Mugunghwa-ho.

Regular services

Lines served

Stops

Stations served 
Stations in bold are required stops.
Jungang line (CheongnyangniーAndong):
Cheongnyangni, Deokso, Yangpyeong, Yongmun, Jipyeong, Seokbul, Ilsin, Maegok, Yangdong,  Samsan, Seowonju, Wonju, Bongyang, Jecheon, Danyang, Punggi, Yeongju, Andong

Yeongdong Line (Yeongju-Donghae):
Yeongju, Bonghwa, Chunyang, Imgi, Hyeondong, Buncheon, Yangwon, Seungbu, Seokpo, Cheoram, Dongbaeksan, Dogye, Singi, Donghae

Yeongdong Line (DonghaeーGangneung):
Donghae, Mukho, Jeongdongjin, Gangneung

Former services
 Janghang Line: Seoul, Yeongdeungpo, Anyang, Suwon, Osan, Seojeongni, Pyeongtaek, Cheonan, Asan, Onyangoncheon, Sinchang
 Honam Line
 Jeolla Line
 Chungbuk Line
 Taebaek Line

Rolling stock

 Korail Class 200000 (since June 2009)
The first rolling stock was manufactured by Hitachi and Hitachi's A-train technology was also applied.

Formations

Interior
Seats in a 2+2 abreast configuration.

References

External links
About Nuriro (Korail) 

Korail
Electric multiple units of South Korea